Messias Júlio Timula (18 December 1948 – 18 February 1998), known simply as Messias, was a Portuguese footballer who played as a central defender.

Club career
Born in Maputo, Portuguese Mozambique, Messias arrived at S.L. Benfica in 1967 as a 19-year old. Facing competition from Raúl Machado, Zeca and Humberto Coelho, he spent his first two seasons in the reserve team.

On 21 November 1969, Messias made his first appearance for the main squad, replacing Coelho in the 53rd minute of a 1–0 away loss to Vitória de Setúbal. He would play two more games in the same season – a European Cup match against Celtic on 26 November and a league one with U.F.C.I. Tomar on 1 December.

After remaining a backup player in 1970–71, Messias had his breakthrough the following campaign, playing 26 matches in all competitions and winning the Primeira Liga title, the Portuguese Cup and reaching the semi-finals of the European Cup. Due to strong competition from Amândio Malta da Silva and Rui Rodrigues, his playing time in 1972–73 and 1973–74 dropped; after his competition either left or lost influence, he regained a pivotal role alongside Coelho and won three more league titles, the first two as starter.

In 1977, after 123 overall appearances, Messias left Benfica and followed many teammates to the North American Soccer League. He took part in 15 games during his spell, reaching the Conference Championship final. He then returned to Portugal, playing for G.D. Riopele in their debut season in the top flight and retiring immediately after.

International career
Messias received his first call up to the Portugal national team when they were selected to appear in the Brazil Independence Cup in 1972. After solid performances at club level, he made his debut on 18 June of that year against Chile, playing all of the remaining games in the tournament including the lost final to Brazil, which would be his last cap.

Honours
Benfica
Primeira Liga: 1970–71, 1971–72, 1972–73, 1974–75, 1975–76, 1976–77
Taça de Portugal: 1971–72

References
General

Specific

External links

1948 births
1998 deaths
Portuguese people of Mozambican descent
Sportspeople from Maputo
Mozambican footballers
Portuguese footballers
Association football defenders
Primeira Liga players
S.L. Benfica footballers
G.D. Riopele players
North American Soccer League (1968–1984) players
Rochester Lancers (1967–1980) players
Portugal international footballers
Portuguese expatriate footballers
Expatriate soccer players in the United States
Portuguese expatriate sportspeople in the United States